Acer tonkinense is an Asian species of maple. It has been found southwestern China (Guangxi, Guizhou, Tibet, Yunnan) and northern Indochina (Vietnam, Thailand, Myanmar).

Acer tonkinense is a deciduous tree up to 12 meters tall with smooth brown bark. Leaves are non-compound, up to 17 cm wide and 15 cm across, thick, usually with 3 lobes.

Subspecies
Acer tonkinense subsp. liquidambarifolium (Hu & W.C.Cheng) W.P.Fang
Acer tonkinense subsp. tonkinense

References

External links
line drawing for Flora of China

tonkinense
Flora of China
Flora of Myanmar
Flora of Thailand
Flora of Vietnam
Plants described in 1912